Lu Yen-hsun tried to defend his 2008 title, but he was eliminated by Oleksandr Dolgopolov Jr. in the second round.
Marcos Baghdatis defeated Denis Istomin 6–3, 1–6, 6–3 in the final.

Seeds

Draw

Final four

Top half

Bottom half

References
 Main Draw
 Qualifying Draw

2009 ATP Challenger Tour
2009 Singles